The Penza Constituency (No.146) is a Russian legislative constituency in Penza Oblast. The constituency covers eastern Penza Oblast and parts of the city of Penza.

Members elected

Election results

1993

|-
! colspan=2 style="background-color:#E9E9E9;text-align:left;vertical-align:top;" |Candidate
! style="background-color:#E9E9E9;text-align:left;vertical-align:top;" |Party
! style="background-color:#E9E9E9;text-align:right;" |Votes
! style="background-color:#E9E9E9;text-align:right;" |%
|-
|style="background-color:"|
|align=left|Viktor Ilyukhin
|align=left|Communist Party
|
|27.40%
|-
|style="background-color:"|
|align=left|Vladimir Grachev
|align=left|Independent
| -
|13.60%
|-
| colspan="5" style="background-color:#E9E9E9;"|
|- style="font-weight:bold"
| colspan="3" style="text-align:left;" | Total
| 
| 100%
|-
| colspan="5" style="background-color:#E9E9E9;"|
|- style="font-weight:bold"
| colspan="4" |Source:
|
|}

1995

|-
! colspan=2 style="background-color:#E9E9E9;text-align:left;vertical-align:top;" |Candidate
! style="background-color:#E9E9E9;text-align:left;vertical-align:top;" |Party
! style="background-color:#E9E9E9;text-align:right;" |Votes
! style="background-color:#E9E9E9;text-align:right;" |%
|-
|style="background-color:"|
|align=left|Viktor Ilyukhin (incumbent)
|align=left|Communist Party
|
|55.66%
|-
|style="background-color:"|
|align=left|Gennady Yeroshin
|align=left|Our Home – Russia
|
|10.71%
|-
|style="background-color:#FF4400"|
|align=left|Vladimir Sheludko
|align=left|Party of Workers' Self-Government
|
|5.75%
|-
|style="background-color:"|
|align=left|Sergey Dubinin
|align=left|Liberal Democratic Party
|
|3.98%
|-
|style="background-color:#3A46CE"|
|align=left|Konstantin Voytsekhovsky
|align=left|Democratic Choice of Russia – United Democrats
|
|3.95%
|-
|style="background-color:#2C299A"|
|align=left|Vladimir Strelnikov
|align=left|Congress of Russian Communities
|
|2.45%
|-
|style="background-color:"|
|align=left|Viktor Belousov
|align=left|Independent
|
|2.44%
|-
|style="background-color:"|
|align=left|Viktor Kiselev
|align=left|Independent
|
|2.23%
|-
|style="background-color:#324194"|
|align=left|Viktor Karabayev
|align=left|Union of Workers of ZhKKh
|
|1.82%
|-
|style="background-color:"|
|align=left|Mikhail Petrov
|align=left|Independent
|
|1.67%
|-
|style="background-color:#A8A821"|
|align=left|Viktor Ivanov
|align=left|Stable Russia
|
|1.65%
|-
|style="background-color:#000000"|
|colspan=2 |against all
|
|6.07%
|-
| colspan="5" style="background-color:#E9E9E9;"|
|- style="font-weight:bold"
| colspan="3" style="text-align:left;" | Total
| 
| 100%
|-
| colspan="5" style="background-color:#E9E9E9;"|
|- style="font-weight:bold"
| colspan="4" |Source:
|
|}

1999

|-
! colspan=2 style="background-color:#E9E9E9;text-align:left;vertical-align:top;" |Candidate
! style="background-color:#E9E9E9;text-align:left;vertical-align:top;" |Party
! style="background-color:#E9E9E9;text-align:right;" |Votes
! style="background-color:#E9E9E9;text-align:right;" |%
|-
|style="background-color:#7C273A"|
|align=left|Viktor Ilyukhin (incumbent)
|align=left|Movement in Support of the Army
|
|30.57%
|-
|style="background-color:#3B9EDF"|
|align=left|Vladimir Ruzlyayev
|align=left|Fatherland – All Russia
|
|19.68%
|-
|style="background-color:"|
|align=left|Aleksandr Kislov
|align=left|Independent
|
|14.93%
|-
|style="background-color:#1042A5"|
|align=left|Nikolay Brusnikin
|align=left|Union of Right Forces
|
|9.84%
|-
|style="background:"| 
|align=left|Vladimir Sheludko
|align=left|Yabloko
|
|5.74%
|-
|style="background-color:"|
|align=left|Vladimir Popov
|align=left|Independent
|
|2.92%
|-
|style="background-color:"|
|align=left|Galina Zhukova
|align=left|Independent
|
|2.58%
|-
|style="background-color:"|
|align=left|Asiyat Dashkin
|align=left|Independent
|
|2.00%
|-
|style="background-color:#FCCA19"|
|align=left|Yevgeny Kuznetsov
|align=left|Congress of Russian Communities-Yury Boldyrev Movement
|
|0.86%
|-
|style="background-color:#000000"|
|colspan=2 |against all
|
|9.27%
|-
| colspan="5" style="background-color:#E9E9E9;"|
|- style="font-weight:bold"
| colspan="3" style="text-align:left;" | Total
| 
| 100%
|-
| colspan="5" style="background-color:#E9E9E9;"|
|- style="font-weight:bold"
| colspan="4" |Source:
|
|}

2003

|-
! colspan=2 style="background-color:#E9E9E9;text-align:left;vertical-align:top;" |Candidate
! style="background-color:#E9E9E9;text-align:left;vertical-align:top;" |Party
! style="background-color:#E9E9E9;text-align:right;" |Votes
! style="background-color:#E9E9E9;text-align:right;" |%
|-
|style="background-color:"|
|align=left|Viktor Lazutkin
|align=left|Independent
|
|54.23%
|-
|style="background:#004090"| 
|align=left|Igor Ryabov
|align=left|New Course — Automobile Russia
|
|9.54%
|-
|style="background:"| 
|align=left|Oleg Kochkin
|align=left|Yabloko
|
|8.83%
|-
|style="background-color:"|
|align=left|Viktor Karabayev
|align=left|Communist Party
|
|8.79%
|-
|style="background-color:"|
|align=left|Maksim Meyer
|align=left|Independent
|
|3.62%
|-
|style="background-color:"|
|align=left|Kyazym Deberdeyev
|align=left|Independent
|
|3.16%
|-
|style="background-color:#000000"|
|colspan=2 |against all
|
|10.35%
|-
| colspan="5" style="background-color:#E9E9E9;"|
|- style="font-weight:bold"
| colspan="3" style="text-align:left;" | Total
| 
| 100%
|-
| colspan="5" style="background-color:#E9E9E9;"|
|- style="font-weight:bold"
| colspan="4" |Source:
|
|}

2016

|-
! colspan=2 style="background-color:#E9E9E9;text-align:left;vertical-align:top;" |Candidate
! style="background-color:#E9E9E9;text-align:leftt;vertical-align:top;" |Party
! style="background-color:#E9E9E9;text-align:right;" |Votes
! style="background-color:#E9E9E9;text-align:right;" |%
|-
| style="background-color: " |
|align=left|Sergey Yesyakov
|align=left|United Russia
|
|63.97%
|-
|style="background-color:"|
|align=left|Georgy Kamnev
|align=left|Communist Party
|
|13.38%
|-
|style="background-color:"|
|align=left|Lyudmila Kolomytseva
|align=left|A Just Russia
|
|8.23%
|-
|style="background-color:"|
|align=left|Pavel Kulikov
|align=left|Liberal Democratic Party
|
|5.78%
|-
|style="background:"| 
|align=left|Andrey Nikiforov
|align=left|Communists of Russia
|
|1.92%
|-
|style="background-color:"|
|align=left|Anatoly Aleksyutin
|align=left|The Greens
|
|1.89%
|-
|style="background-color:"|
|align=left|Aleksey Pakayev
|align=left|Rodina
|
|1.25%
|-
|style="background-color:"|
|align=left|Sergey Korobov
|align=left|Patriots of Russia
|
|1.14%
|-
| colspan="5" style="background-color:#E9E9E9;"|
|- style="font-weight:bold"
| colspan="3" style="text-align:left;" | Total
| 
| 100%
|-
| colspan="5" style="background-color:#E9E9E9;"|
|- style="font-weight:bold"
| colspan="4" |Source:
|
|}

2021

|-
! colspan=2 style="background-color:#E9E9E9;text-align:left;vertical-align:top;" |Candidate
! style="background-color:#E9E9E9;text-align:left;vertical-align:top;" |Party
! style="background-color:#E9E9E9;text-align:right;" |Votes
! style="background-color:#E9E9E9;text-align:right;" |%
|-
|style="background-color: " |
|align=left|Igor Rudensky
|align=left|United Russia
|
|60.40%
|-
|style="background-color:"|
|align=left|Aleksey Ivanov
|align=left|Communist Party
|
|15.12%
|-
|style="background-color:"|
|align=left|Pavel Kulikov
|align=left|Liberal Democratic Party
|
|5.16%
|-
|style="background-color: "|
|align=left|Andrey Abramov
|align=left|Party of Pensioners
|
|4.37%
|-
|style="background-color: "|
|align=left|Sergey Novikov
|align=left|New People
|
|4.27%
|-
|style="background-color:"|
|align=left|Anton Yurchenko
|align=left|A Just Russia — For Truth
|
|4.01%
|-
|style="background-color:"|
|align=left|Alina Mozhachkina-Gribanova
|align=left|The Greens
|
|2.18%
|-
|style="background-color: " |
|align=left|Yury Voblikov
|align=left|Yabloko
|
|1.32%
|-
|style="background-color: " |
|align=left|Sergey Yakhov
|align=left|Russian Party of Freedom and Justice
|
|1.27%
|-
| colspan="5" style="background-color:#E9E9E9;"|
|- style="font-weight:bold"
| colspan="3" style="text-align:left;" | Total
| 
| 100%
|-
| colspan="5" style="background-color:#E9E9E9;"|
|- style="font-weight:bold"
| colspan="4" |Source:
|
|}

Notes

References

Russian legislative constituencies
Politics of Penza Oblast